The women's +78 kg competition in judo at the 2020 Summer Olympics in Tokyo was held on 30 July 2021 at the Nippon Budokan.

Results

Finals

Repechage

Pool A

Pool B

Pool C

Pool D

Weigh-in List
Weights in table are listed in Kg.

References

External links
 
 Draw (archived)

W79
Judo at the Summer Olympics Women's Heavyweight
Women's events at the 2020 Summer Olympics
Olympics W79